Soikat is a male given name meaning (sea) shore, beach or bank. It may refer to:

Saikat (umpire) or Sharfuddoula Ibne Shahid (born 1976), Bangladeshi cricketer and international cricket umpire
Saikat Ahamed, English actor
Saikat Ali (cricketer, born 1991), Bangladeshi cricketer
Saikat Chakrabarti, American political advisor, activist and software engineer
Saikat Saha Roy (born 1991), Indian footballer

Bengali names